In criminology, a calling card is a particular object sometimes left behind by a criminal at a scene of a crime, often as a way of taunting police or claiming responsibility. The name is derived from the cards that people used to leave when they went to visit someone's house and the resident was absent. A calling card can also be used as an individual's way of telling someone they are alive after they have run away or disappeared without revealing themselves or having direct contact with that person. It is often left at a bed side table while the person is asleep, at the living room floor and sometimes even at a grave yard if they know the times someone goes to visit their loved ones. However, some criminals choose not to leave a calling card, as it may be used by authorities or detectives to trace the criminal, and eventually arrest them.

Historical examples
 Jack the Ripper is believed to have left two calling cards by Goulston Street, London on September 30, 1888, the night he murdered Elizabeth Stride and Catherine Eddowes: a scrap of Eddowes' apron and some graffiti reading Juwes are the men That Will not be Blamed for nothing. Some authors believe the graffiti may have already been there prior to the apron piece being dropped and that the two should not be linked.
 The 1968 Zodiac Killer in San Francisco would mail cryptograms to the San Francisco Chronicle made up of letters and zodiac signs, signed with a sun cross.
 The Washington, D.C. Beltway sniper attacks in 2002 were linked by a series of Tarot cards left by the snipers, which contained messages for the policemen investigating the crimes.

Examples in fiction

 In the 1919–1920 Fritz Lang adventure film series The Spiders a spider was the calling card for the criminal organization known as 'The Spiders'.
 In the 1963 movie The Pink Panther, the "Phantom" would leave behind a white glove with a monogrammed P on it after every successful theft.
 In the 1990 film Home Alone, the "Wet Bandits" rob the houses of people on vacation, and leave the water running. One of them, Harry Lyme, is against this, as near the end, this is what leads to their eventual arrest. They return as the "Sticky Bandits" in Home Alone 2: Lost in New York.
 In the novel, The Red Necklace by Sally Gardner, the villainous Count Kalliovski leaves a necklace of red silk set with garnets upon each of his murder victims, making it appear as though the victim's throat has been slit.
 In the 2000 book Angels & Demons by Dan Brown, a Hassassin uses brands representing the four classical elements as calling cards in a series of ritualistic murders related to each element (e.g. fire for one victim who had been burned to death.)
In the 1905 West End play, the Scarlet Pimpernel leaves a calling card (a scarlet pimpernel) at each of his interventions. 
 In DC Comics, Batman's enemies often leave calling cards. In particular, his arch-enemy, The Joker, uses two types of calling cards, one is a simple joker card from a deck of playing cards, which was used in the end of the film Batman Begins, and its sequel The Dark Knight. The other is by far more sinister—Joker Venom, which causes death while laughing madly and applies a permanent, ear-to-ear, grin.
 Another Batman villain, The Riddler, leaves behind a riddle or other puzzle, whose solution is a clue to his overall plot.
 In the 2000 novel Holes, Kate Barlow kisses the corpses of her victims, leaving a lipstick mark at every murder.
 In the 2004 movie Saw the killer, Jigsaw, cuts a jigsaw piece out of the flesh of the victim, symbolizing the piece that the person was missing.
 In the 2004 movie Ocean's Twelve, the "Night Fox" leaves behind an onyx fox at every robbery.
 In the first couple of books in The Executioner series, the main character, Mack Bolan, would leave behind a Marksman's medal on or near his victims.
 In the Sucker Punch video games Sly Cooper and the Thievious Raccoonus, Sly 2: Band of Thieves, and Sly 3: Honor Among Thieves, the main character, Sly Cooper, always leaves behind a blue calling card in the shape of his raccoon-head logo.
 In the 2010 game Heavy Rain, the Origami Killer leaves an origami figure and an orchid with his victims' bodies.
 In the 2007 Jo Nesbø novel The Snowman, as well as its film adaptation, the killer leaves behind a snowman at the scenes of his crimes, which leads to him being christened "the Snowman killer".

References

Forensic evidence